Igor Nikolayevich Neuchev (born 27 October 1974) is a Russian professional football coach and a former player. He is the assistant manager of FC Spartak Tambov.

Club career
He made his debut in the Russian Premier League in 1997 for FC Fakel Voronezh.

References

1974 births
Footballers from Tambov
Living people
Russian footballers
FC Spartak Tambov players
FC Fakel Voronezh players
FC Metallurg Lipetsk players
Russian Premier League players
FC Sodovik Sterlitamak players
Association football midfielders
FC Orenburg players
FC Spartak-UGP Anapa players
Russian football managers